Advancing Chemistry by Enhancing Learning in the Laboratory (ACELL) is a project for improving the teaching of Chemistry in the Laboratory.

History 
The current ACELL project began as APCELL (Australian Physical Chemistry Enhanced Laboratory Learning) in the late 1990s.  Initially funded by the Australian Government through its Committee for University Teaching and Staff Development (CUTSD) program, the aim of APCELL was to build a database of tested, educationally-sound undergraduate level experiments in physical chemistry.  APCELL ran several workshops at which experiments were tested by staff and students from Australian universities.

To be accepted to the APCELL database, an experiment had to be tested in a third-party laboratory (such as at a workshop), be judged to be educationally-sound, and to complete a peer review process.  The educational analyses of experiments which completed this process were published in the Australian Journal of Education in Chemistry.

Additional funding was received from the Department of Education, Science and Training (Australia) through its Higher Education Innovation Program (HEIP) to enable the project to be extended to all areas of chemistry, which is the reason for the name change from APCELL to ACELL.

Whilst the ACELL project is run with the active support of its many contributors, the management team is spread across four universities: Macquarie University, the University of Adelaide, the University of Sydney, and Curtin University of Technology.

Current programs 
In February 2006 ACELL ran a workshop hosted by the University of Sydney. This was a 3-day workshop, attended by 33 staff delegates and 31 students from 27 universities around Australia and New Zealand. Delegates stayed in St. John's College on the university grounds.

At this workshop staff and students reviewed 33 experiments submitted by the different participating universities. After completing the activities there were debrief sessions in the evening. All those who completed experiments also completed surveys on the experiment and the documentation behind it.

Another (smaller) workshop was run in February 2007 as a satellite activity of the Royal Australian Chemical Institute (RACI) joint Organic and Physical Chemistry Division Conference OPC07.  This workshop will be hosted by the University of Adelaide.

See also
Royal Australian Chemical Institute (RACI)

References

External links 
Australian Physical Chemistry Enhanced Laboratory Learning (APCELL)
Advancing Chemistry by Enhancing Learning in the Laboratory (ACELL)
Organic and Physical Chemistry Conference 2007 (OPC07)

Science and technology in Australia
Chemistry education
Undergraduate education